Al-Ba'ij is a residential area located in the Northwestern Badia District, Mafraq Governorate, Jordan. The region belongs to the northwestern Badia district, which includes 15 districts. Its population is estimated at 6,305, according to the 2015 census.

References

External links 
Photos of Ba'ij at the American Center of Research

Populated places in Mafraq Governorate